Møteplassen Peak is the northernmost peak in the group bordering the south side of Frostlendet Valley, in the Borg Massif of Queen Maud Land, Antarctica. It was mapped by Norwegian cartographers from surveys and air photos by the Norwegian–British–Swedish Antarctic Expedition (1949–52) and named "Møteplassen" (the meeting place).

References

Mountains of Queen Maud Land
Princess Martha Coast